Conan and the Shaman's Curse is a fantasy novel by American writer Sean A. Moore, featuring Robert E. Howard's  sword and sorcery hero Conan the Barbarian. It was first published in paperback by Tor Books in January 1996.

Plot
At the end of a battle in which both forces are nearly wiped out, Conan slays the last member of the enemy host, a shaman whose dying curse turns the Cimmerian into a killer were-ape when the moon is full. Subsequent misfortunes include a battle with huge vultures and getting marooned on an island inhabited by a lost race of giants, all apparent consequences of his curse. Eventually, he finds another magician able to lift it.

Reception
Reviewer Don D'Ammassa calls the book "the weakest of Moore's three Conan pastiches although it has some good bits scattered throughout."

Notes

References
Fantastic Fiction entry for Conan and the Shaman's Curse

1996 American novels
1996 fantasy novels
Conan the Barbarian novels
American fantasy novels
Tor Books books